Stefan Liv Memorial Trophy is awarded annually to the Swedish Hockey League (SHL) playoffs' most valuable player (MVP), as decided by SICO (Sweden's Ice hockey players Central Organisation). It was installed in 2010 and resembles the Conn Smythe Trophy of the NHL. The trophy was renamed in honour of Stefan Liv in 2013. Stefan Liv, aged 30, was killed in the 2011 Lokomotiv Yaroslavl plane crash, along with his teammates and team staff of Russian club Lokomotiv Yaroslavl of the Kontinental Hockey League (KHL).

Winners

Notes

References

External links 
SICO - Sveriges Ishockeyspelares Centralorganisation

Awards established in 2010
Swedish ice hockey trophies and awards
Swedish Hockey League
2010 establishments in Sweden